Sabine's puffback (Dryoscopus sabini), also known as the large-billed puffback, is a species of bird in the family Malaconotidae.  It is native to the African tropical rainforest (western and sparsely throughout Central Africa).  Its natural habitats are subtropical or tropical moist lowland forests and subtropical or tropical swamps.

Its common name and Latin binomial commemorate lawyer and naturalist Joseph Sabine.

References

Sabine's puffback
Birds of the African tropical rainforest
Sabine's puffback
Sabine's puffback
Taxonomy articles created by Polbot